Marlon  Starling (born August 29, 1959) is an American former professional boxer who competed from 1979 to 1990. He held the WBA welterweight title from 1987 to 1988 and the WBC welterweight title from 1989 to 1990.

Professional boxing career

Starling was born in Hartford, Connecticut in 1959. He got his start with help from coach, Johnny Duke, who helped him train for the national Junior Olympics championship. He turned professional in 1979. After 25 straight wins to start his professional career, he lost his first fight, a 12-round split-decision to Donald Curry in 1982. Starling had a rematch with Curry in 1984, challenging for the WBA and IBF welterweight titles. Starling lost by a 15-round decision. Starling's fighting style features what is referred to as a high guard.

Starling's second world title fight came in 1987. He knocked out Mark Breland in the 11th round to win the WBA welterweight title. In his third title defense, Starling lost the title in controversial fashion to Tomas Molinares. Molinares hit Starling with a punch that was thrown around the same time as the bell sounded to end round six. Starling went down for the only time in his career, and the referee counted him out. Molinares was declared the new champion by knock out. However, the decision was later changed to a no contest but the Colombian kept the title.

In 1989, Starling knocked out Lloyd Honeyghan to win the WBC welterweight titles. The following year, Starling challenged Michael Nunn for the IBF middleweight title, but lost by decision. In his next fight, Starling lost his welterweight titles in a close decision to Maurice Blocker. That was Starling's last fight. He retired with a record of 45-6-1-1 (27 KOs).

Professional boxing record

See also
List of world welterweight boxing champions

References

External links

1959 births
Living people
American male boxers
African-American boxers
Boxers from Connecticut
Sportspeople from Hartford, Connecticut
Welterweight boxers
World welterweight boxing champions
World Boxing Association champions
World Boxing Council champions
The Ring (magazine) champions